The Mazghuna Pyramids may refer to:

 Northern Mazghuna pyramid, possibly belonging to Sobekneferu
 Southern Mazghuna pyramid, possibly belonging to Amenemhat IV